Speer und Er (literally "Speer and He", released as Speer and Hitler: The Devil's Architect) is a three-part German docudrama starring Sebastian Koch as Albert Speer and Tobias Moretti as Adolf Hitler. It mixes historical film material with reconstructions, as well as interviews with three of Speer's children, Albert Speer Jr., Arnold Speer and Hilde Schramm.

The appended documentary confronts several interviewees including Wolf Jobst Siedler, Joachim Fest and Speer relatives with evidence that Speer knew in detail that some Nazi concentration camps functioned as killing factories, something he consistently maintained he could have found out but never actually knew.

Structure 
 Part 1: Germania – The Delusion
 Part 2: Nuremberg – The Trial
 Part 3: Spandau – The Punishment
 Documentary

Cast 
The following list gives the name of each actor followed by the real historical figure played. It does not include the many people interviewed as themselves.

Sources

External links 
 

2000s German television series
2000s German television miniseries
2005 German television series debuts
2005 German television series endings
German-language television shows
Docudrama television series
Television shows based on biographies
Television shows set in Berlin
World War II television series
Das Erste original programming
Documentary films about Adolf Hitler
Cultural depictions of Adolf Hitler
Cultural depictions of Eva Braun
Cultural depictions of Joseph Goebbels
Cultural depictions of Hermann Göring
Cultural depictions of Albert Speer
Cultural depictions of Heinrich Himmler
2005 films